The Synod of Victory (Synod of the Grove of Victory, Synod of Caerleon) was a church council held in Caerleon, Wales, around AD 569. While some sources say it was a continuation of the Synod of Brefi to condemn the heresy of Pelagianism, others, such as Baring-Gould say it was in regards to penitential canons.

It was officiated by Saint David. The synod ratified the canons and decrees of Brefi as well as a code of rules which he had drawn up for the regulation of the British Church, a copy of which remained in the Cathedral of S. David's until it was lost in an incursion of pirates.

References
 

569
6th century in Wales
Celtic Christianity
History of Christianity in Wales
6th-century church councils
History of Newport, Wales
Caerleon
Heresy in Christianity in the Middle Ages